Illinois Route 37, Illinois 37 or IL 37, is a  north–south state highway in southern Illinois. IL 37's southern terminus is at U.S. Route 51 (US 51) and IL 3 in Cairo and the northern terminus is at US 45 in Watson.

Route description
Between Effingham and a point near Watson, a segment in which it shared a route with U.S. Route 45, Illinois 37 has been decommissioned in favor of US 45. Between Watson and just north of Salem, it angles westward and toward the south before meeting US 50 at Salem, Illinois 15 and Illinois 142 at Mount Vernon, Interstate 64 south of Mount Vernon, Illinois 14 and Illinois 34 at Benton, Illinois 149 at West Frankfort, Illinois 13 at Marion, and US 51 and Illinois 3 at its current southern terminus at Urbandale. Both of Illinois Route 148's termini branch from Route 37, the north terminus at Mount Vernon, and the southern terminus just north of Pulley's Mill. It has no direct connection to Interstate 24, which is far better approached from Interstate 57.

All of Illinois 37 is an undivided surface route.

History
Originally connecting Effingham to Cairo, it was a heavily-traveled highway before Interstate 57 was opened. That Interstate, which lies very close to most of Illinois 37 (indeed the entire route north of Pulleys Mill), supplanted it as a through route. Illinois 37 was long a part of the most direct route between Chicago and Memphis. llinois 37 has become a route of local significance instead of the busy, long-distance, inter-city highway that it was until the 1970s. As a town-to-town route, it especially serves communities which have no access to Interstate 57.

Major intersections

References

External links

 Illinois Highway Ends: Illinois Route 37

037
Transportation in Alexander County, Illinois
Transportation in Pulaski County, Illinois
Transportation in Johnson County, Illinois
Transportation in Williamson County, Illinois
Transportation in Franklin County, Illinois
Transportation in Jefferson County, Illinois
Transportation in Marion County, Illinois
Transportation in Fayette County, Illinois
Transportation in Clay County, Illinois
Transportation in Effingham County, Illinois